Ewbank is a United Kingdom company.  Ewbank  may also refer to:

Ewbank (name)
Ewbank da Câmara, municipality in Minas Gerais, Brazil
Ewbank scale, a numerical scale for grading the difficulty of rock climbing routes, named after John Ewbank
Ewbank, Singleton, heritage-listed building in Singleton, New South Wales, Australia

See also
Eubank (disambiguation)
Ewbanks, Illinois
Ubank Limited, a South African bank operating in the microfinance sector
UBank, an Australian bank